Jiří Holeček (born March 18, 1944) is a Czech professional ice hockey coach and former player. Holeček played in the Czechoslovak Elite League from 1964 to 1979, and on the Czechoslovak national team for many years.

After joining the military he participated in the hockey camp of Dukla Jihlava, but coming from an insignificant Slávia team at the time, he did not make it higher than the number three goaltender and was loaned to HC Košice in the eastern part of the country. After starting his career on the Košice team in 1963–64, Holecek played there for 10 years until he joined Sparta Prague for the 1973/1974 season. Holecek played 488 league games, and despite being awarded the Czechoslovak Golden Hockey Stick award for the best player in 1974, he never won the league title.

Holecek played 164 games for the national team, including ten World Championships (leading the team to gold in 1972, 1976, and 1977), being named the best goaltender five times. He played at the 1972 and 1976 Olympics and the 1976 Canada Cup.

Holecek finished his playing career in 1981 in West Germany. In 1980s he worked as a coach of the Czechoslovak national ice hockey team goaltenders. He was inducted into the IIHF hall of fame in 1998. Currently, he is working as goalie coach for one of the Prague junior hockey teams, HC Hvězda Praha.

References

External links 
 
 HC Sparta Praha Klub Historie 
 GOALIE ACADEMY INTERNATIONAL 
 
 
 

1944 births
Czechoslovak ice hockey coaches
Czechoslovak ice hockey goaltenders
HC Košice players
HC Sparta Praha players
Ice hockey players at the 1972 Winter Olympics
Ice hockey players at the 1976 Winter Olympics
IIHF Hall of Fame inductees
Living people
Medalists at the 1972 Winter Olympics
Medalists at the 1976 Winter Olympics
Olympic bronze medalists for Czechoslovakia
Olympic ice hockey players of Czechoslovakia
Olympic medalists in ice hockey
Olympic silver medalists for Czechoslovakia
Ice hockey people from Prague
Czechoslovak expatriate sportspeople in West Germany
Czechoslovak expatriate ice hockey people
Expatriate ice hockey players in West Germany